The Khazz was the ethnarch of the Muslim community in Khazaria. The Khazz resided in the city of Khazaran. He may have had some authority over the division of the army known as the Arsiyah.

References
Kevin Alan Brook. The Jews of Khazaria. 3rd ed. Rowman & Littlefield Publishers, 2018.
Douglas M. Dunlop. The History of the Jewish Khazars, Princeton, N.J.: Princeton University Press, 1954.
Peter B. Golden. Khazar Studies: An Historico-Philological Inquiry into the Origins of the Khazars. Budapest: Akadémiai Kiadó, 1980.
Norman Golb and Omeljan Pritsak, Khazarian Hebrew Documents of the Tenth Century. Ithaca: Cornell University Press, 1982.

Khazar titles